Boca Juniors Reserves and Academy are the reserve and youth academy teams of Boca Juniors. The reserve team is currently coached by former club players Hugo Ibarra and Mauricio Serna, after Sebastián Battaglia was appointed as Senior squad's coach.

Boca Juniors is the most winning Torneo de Reserva championships with 21 titles won since the squad was established in 1910. Boca Juniors reserve team plays in the "Primera División de Reserva", the reserve division of Primera División. Home matches are played at Complejo "Pedro Pompilio", sited in La Boca neighborhood of Buenos Aires.

The Academy 

Known as "The Boca Factory", Boca Juniors youth divisions contains teams from under-8 to under-20 level. They participate in Argentina's youth leagues organized by the Argentine Football Association. In 1996 Mauricio Macri (who had been elected president of the club one year later) stated that rather than buy players for huge money only to put too much expectation on them and watch them under-perform, they wanted to create their own stars. Therefore, Boca hired two very influential figures; one was Bernardo Griffa, a leading expert of youth in Argentina who had created a successful scouting network at Newell's Old Boys. The second was Ramón Maddoni, the king of 'baby football' (indoor six-a-side football for 5–12 year olds), who had a long career at Club Parque at the moment of being hired by Boca Juniors.

Since then, Boca's academy has brought through, and also sold, more than 350 homegrown players from all age categories. From the list of the 350 players, more than 130 of the academy graduates would play around the world, including in Argentina, Spain, Italy, England and many others in places ranging from Germany and the Netherlands to China and Israel. More than 35 leagues contain players that were raised and developed by the Boca academy system. The players are taught the same formation (4–3–1–2) from early on to the first-team. This makes fitting into the first-team far easier for a young player. Boca's under-20 team were regular participants in the Under-20 Copa Libertadores and other international youth football tournaments.

Scouting
The scouting system is comprehensive. There is a Boca Juniors scout in every small town and close to every village. Nearly all are ordinary people, such as teachers, butchers or policemen, and the head of the youth system, Jorge Griffa, regularly travel around Argentina when he took over and listened to the watching crowd, hiring the most appropriate as a scout for the area.

Players

Current squad

Out on loan
}

Notable graduates
Note: Player's career in Boca Juniors' senior squad is indicated in brackets:

  Américo Tesoriere 
  Ernesto Lazzatti 
  Natalio Pescia 
  Antonio Rattín 
  Ángel Clemente Rojas 
  Roberto Mouzo 
  Enzo Ferrero 
  Hugo Perotti 
  Alberto Tarantini 
  Osvaldo Potente 
  Oscar Ruggeri 
  Diego Soñora 
  Diego Latorre 
  Luis Medero 
  Sebastián Battaglia 
  Nicolás Burdisso 
  Clemente Rodríguez 
  Cristian Chávez  
  Javier García 
  Ricardo Noir 
  Juan Forlín  
  Josué Ayala 
  Sony Nordé  
  Nicolás Colazo  
  Jonathan Fabbro 
  Carlos Tevez 
  Fernando Gago 
  Éver Banega 
  Nicolás Gaitán 
  Facundo Roncaglia 
  Lucas Viatri 
  Neri Cardozo 
  Emiliano Insúa 
  Fabián Monzón
  Pablo Mouche 
  Nicolás Colazo 
  Nicolás Blandi 
  Juan Sánchez Miño 
  Emanuel Insúa 
  Luciano Acosta 
  Adrián Cubas 
  Rodrigo Bentancur 
  Agustín Almendra 
  Leonardo Balerdi 
  Nicolás Capaldo
  Agustín Obando
  Marcelo Weigandt 
  Alan Varela 
  Exequiel Zeballos 
  Cristian Medina 

Notes

Titles
 Torneo de Reserva de Primera División (21): 1918, 1919, 1924, 1926, 1928, 1930, 1937, 1940, 1955, 1956, 1962, 1967, 1968, 1991–92, 1997–98, 2006–07, 2007–08, 2009–10, 2011–12
 Trofeo de Campeones (1): 2022

References

External links
 

Reserves and Academy|B
B
B